Andreas Meyer (born October 20, 1954) is a retired Swiss professional ice hockey defenceman who played for SCL Tigers in the National League A. He also represented the Swiss national team at the 1976 Winter Olympics.

References

External links

Living people
Swiss ice hockey defencemen
1954 births
Ice hockey players at the 1976 Winter Olympics
Olympic ice hockey players of Switzerland